Berliner is most often used to designate a citizen of Berlin, Germany

Berliner may also refer to:

People
 Berliner (surname)

Places
 Berliner Lake, a lake in Minnesota, United States
 Berliner Philharmonie, concert hall in Berlin, Germany
 Berliner See, a lake in Mecklenburg-Vorpommern, Germany
 Berliner Straße (disambiguation), multiple streets in Germany with the name

Arts, Entertainment, Media 
 Berliner (format), a paper size in newspapers
 Berliner Abendblatt, the leading weekly newspaper in Berlin
 Berliner Ensemble, a German theatre company
 Berliner Kurier, a regional daily tabloid
 Berliner Messe, or Berlin Mass, a mass by Arvo Pärt
 Berliner Morgenpost, 2nd most read newspaper in Berlin
 Berliner Symphoniker, symphony orchestra in Berlin
 Berliner Verkehrsblätter, a journal on public transport in Berlin
 Berliner Woche, advertising weekly in Berlin
 Berliner Zeitung, daily newspaper in Berlin
 The Berliner (film), a 1948 German motion picture directed by Robert A. Stemmle

Companies, organizations
 Berliner AK 07, football club
 Berliner BC 03, former football club
 Berliner FV, football club
 Berliner RC, rugby club
 Berliner Sport-Club, football club
 Berliner Aircraft Company, now Berliner-Joyce Aircraft
 Berliner Gramophone, a record label
 Berliner Motor Corporation, former US motorcycle distributor founded by the Berliner Brothers

Foods
 Berliner (doughnut), a pastry
 Berliner Pilsner, a brand of beer
 Berliner Weisse, a regional style of beer from Northern Germany

Transport
 Berliner (train), former City Night Line service on the Zürich-Berlin Ostbahnhof route
 Berliner Helicopter, a series of experimental helicopters built by Henry Berliner
 Berliner Verkehrsbetriebe, the public transport company of Berlin

Other uses
 Berliner, a former regional currency in Berlin
 Berliner, a type of tent for emergency bivouac
 "", a famous speech by John F. Kennedy

See also 
 Berlin (disambiguation)
 East Berlin (disambiguation)
 West Berlin (disambiguation)
 New Berlin (disambiguation)